Helikopter Service Flight 165 was a crash of a Sikorsky S-61 helicopter into the North Sea,  northwest of Bergen, Norway, on 26 June 1978. The aircraft was en route from Bergen Airport, Flesland to Statfjord A, an offshore oil platform. The accident was caused by a fatigue crack in a knuckle joint, causing one of the rotor blades to loosen. All eighteen people on board were killed in the crash.

References

Aviation accidents and incidents in Norway
CHC Helikopter Service accidents and incidents
Accidents and incidents involving the Sikorsky S-61
Aviation accidents and incidents in 1978
1978 in Norway
Aviation accidents and incidents in the North Sea
Airliner accidents and incidents caused by in-flight structural failure
June 1978 events in Europe